Clay-Chalkville High School (CCHS) is a public high school in Clay, a suburb of Birmingham, Alabama, United States. It is the second largest of the Jefferson County Board of Education's fourteen high schools. School colors are navy blue and silver, and the athletic teams are called the Cougars. CCHS competes in AHSAA Class 6A athletics.  The school was recognized by "Niche.com" as the 42nd "Best High School for Athletes in Alabama" among the top 50 in 2020.  CCHS was one of only two Jefferson County System schools designed among the state's more than 300 high schools.

Student profile 
Enrollment in grades 9-12 for the 2020-21 school year is 1,259 students. Approximately 78% of students are African-American, 20% are white, 1% Asian-American, and 1% are two or more races. Roughly 50% of students qualify for free or reduced price lunch.

CCHS has a graduation rate of 94%. Approximately 84% of its students meet or exceed state proficiency standards in mathematics, and 81% meet or exceed standards in reading. The average ACT score for CCHS students is 21 and the average SAT Score is 1480.

Campus
The CCHS campus was constructed in 1996 and is located on the border of Clay and Pinson. It consists of a one-level building with 53 classrooms, four computer labs, four science labs, a choral room, a band room, a media center, a fine arts room, a video production studio, a lunch room, practice and spectator gymnasiums, a 650-seat auditorium, and 766 spaces for parking. The school has fields for baseball, softball, football, and practice.  Stadium seating was removed from the old Shades Valley High School and repaired for use at CCHS. The 9,880 sq. ft. media center is a focal point for the school and includes a time capsule placed by the Class of 2001.  It overlooks an outdoor amphitheatre through a curved wall of windows. The auditorium has a fully complemented stage with fly tower and scene room.

Curriculum 
CCHS students have access to eight Advanced Placement courses: 
 Biology
 Calculus
 Chemistry
 English Language & Composition
 English Literature & Composition
 Psychology
 U.S. History
 Computer Science
CCHS students can also take courses in one of six career-based academies:
 Arts & Communication Academy, including vocal and instrumental training, theater, journalism, and visual arts
 Building Science Academy, including agriscience, construction, drafting and design
 Business, Marketing, and Information Technology Academy, which offers courses in entrepreneurship, leadership, and computing fundamentals
 Culinary Arts Academy, offering both training in both culinary arts and tourism/hospitality
 Educational Training & Human Services Academy, which offers a variety of courses in consumer sciences, child development, psychology, and education
 Health Science Academy, with classes in sports medicine, wellness, and nursing fundamentals 
CCHS students are eligible for dual enrollment at Jefferson State Community College, allowing them to earn high school and college credit simultaneously.

Athletics 
CCHS competes in AHSAA Class 6A athletics and fields teams in the following sports:
 Baseball
 Basketball
 Cheerleading
 Cross Country
 Football
 Indoor Track & Field
 Outdoor Track & Field
 Soccer
 Softball
 Tennis
 Volleyball
 Wrestling
CCHS has won state championships in baseball (2003) and football (1999, 2014, 2021). It has won eight regional championships in football: 2004, 2005, 2006, 2012, 2013, 2014, 2015, and 2021.

Football 
When football head coach Toney Pugh left in December 1998 to start Oak Mountain High School, former Erwin and Mortimer Jordan head coach Hal Riddle came in to lead the Cougar football program. In his first season, 1999, Riddle carried the Cougars to the Class 6A football Super 6 at Legion Field, beating Robert E. Lee-Montgomery, 30–27, in overtime for the school's first Alabama High School Athletic Association state championship. A first-half field goal by Matt Briggs stands as the longest field goal in the Class 6A title game. The Cougars' biggest rivalry began the season before, as CCHS beat Hewitt-Trussville High School in their first two meetings. The Cougars would win their second Alabama High School Athletic Association Class 6A football title in 2014 by beating the Saraland Spartans in a competitive 36–31 game at Jordan-Hare Stadium in Auburn, Alabama. The victory capped a 15–0 season which ended with the Cougars being ranked 35th in the nation by Max Preps and being featured on the website's Tour of Champions.

In 2011, the CCHS football team, undefeated at the time, was caught up in controversy when it was accused of using an ineligible player for nine games and therefore had to forfeit those games. It appealed the forfeits to the Alabama High School Athletic Association, but the appeal was denied. It later took the case to the Jefferson County Circuit Court, where it was granted an injunctive relief and allowed back in the AHSAA playoffs. However, the Etowah County School System challenged the court's decision in order to put Gadsden City High School, who was the 4th seed in region 7 when CCHS forfeited the wins, back in the playoffs. Gadsden City ended up competing instead of CCHS, and was shut out in the first-round game against Mountain Brook High School 0-21.

Other sports 
In 2003, head coach Jeff Mauldin and the Cougars' baseball team won the 6A state championship in Montgomery. The Cougars returned to the title game in 2005 and 2006, but finished second. The boys' tennis team placed first in the Jefferson County Tournament in the past two years. Women's and men's basketball teams have also advanced to post season games throughout the school's short history. The school's softball team has won numerous area and regional tournaments and was led by Coach CJ (Urse) Hawkins to the state championship game in 2004 and the state quarterfinals in 2005.

Notable alumni

 A. J. Davis, former cornerback for the New Orleans Saints
 Quinton Dial, former defensive end for the San Francisco 49ers
 Courtney Porter, Miss Alabama 2011
 Darrin Reaves, former running back for the Carolina Panthers
 YBN Nahmir, rapper
Nico Collins, wide receiver for the Houston Texans

References

External links
CCHS website
CCHS athletics
CCHS profile on Niche
CCHS profile on SchoolDigger
CCHS football history

Public high schools in Alabama
Educational institutions established in 1996
Schools in Jefferson County, Alabama
1996 establishments in Alabama